Moatsü is a festival celebrated by the Ao people of Nagaland, India. it is celebrated in the first week of May every year. Various rituals are performed during this period. The Aos observe Moatsü Mong after the sowing is done. The festival provides them a period of recreation and entertainment after the stressful work of clearing fields, burning jungles, sowing seeds, cleaning up the Tsubu (wells) and repairs and construction of houses by elders of the Putu Menden, stretching over a week. The Moatsü festival is marked by peppy songs and dances. The whole festival full of merrymaking and fun is observed only for three days from May 1 to 3. 

During this festival, one of the symbolic celebrations is Sangpangtu, where a big fire is lit and men and women sit around it putting on their complete best attire, the womenfolk serve the wine and meat. Village witch doctors forecast whether good or evil days are awaiting the people and the village by readings of the celebration of the Moatsü festival.

Customs and rituals
The natural customary practice of the was competing in making the best rice-beer and rearing the best possible pigs and cows to be slaughtered during the festival. The women weave the best of traditional garments and adorn themselves with all their finery. They join the men in dancing, eating and drinking and composing warrior songs. Singing songs in praise of the lover and the village as a whole is done and the older men encourage the young people to be bold and heroic to defend and protect them from enemies as head-hunting was practiced during their fore-fathers time.

During this festival, one of the symbolic celebrations is Sangpangtu where a big fire is lit and women & men sit around it. The best women serve the best wine and meat and make merry. The forecast is made by the righteous men who live by the guidance of the Almighty to see whether good or evil days are awaiting the people.

Aos have another festival called Tsüngrem Mong. It is celebrated in the eve of the harvest. However, nowadays the Aos celebrate this festival from 1 to 3 August.

Prior to the start of this festival, the village will declare the Süngküm (Village Gate) closed and free entry or exit is restricted and regulated for people who do not belong to that particular village.

Parties of old and young wearing their colourful costumes sing songs and perform dances to express their gratitude to the supreme power for helping the crops to grow well. They provide the best offerings to the supreme power for abundant blessings. These festivals provide opportunities to the budding generations and village stalwarts to demonstrate their intellectual skill and physical powers. A handful of young men hold the stage and tell amusing stories about their elders. Peals of laughter greet them and young & old jump in excitement.

These festivals are usually rounded off by a tug of war between men and women. Stories are galore that men lose to please their womenfolk. But none has refuted the argument that attracted by the charm of their opponents, absorbed by their sweet songs and regaled by their very presence men lose gracefully. The only defense offered is that men have to pull uphill and the women downhill. Whatever the spirit behind this sport it is a treat to see and an honour to participate.

The festival's meaning
The principal aim of this festival is to invoke Almighty God's blessings after finishing such diverse activities:
 Repairs and construction of houses by elders of the Putu Menden (Village Council)
 Marriages in the spring season
 Ploughing of old and new Jhum Kheti
 Cleaning up the Tsubü (Water Wells)

On completion of all these manifold activities celebrations of Moatsü Mong takes place.

See also 
 List of traditional Naga festivals

References

External links
 Moatsü Mong: The Festival of Ao Tribe
 Festivals In Nagaland: Moatsu

Festivals in Nagaland
May observances
Mokokchung